is a former Japanese adult video (AV) actress and former Japanese pop singer.

Life and career
Uehara debuted in 2001 with the song  which was featured on the anime Detective Conan as its 13th ending song. Both the song and the subsequent album were highly successful. Signed up to Giza Studio, after several minor hits she was fired by her agency in 2007 as she was involved in a fraud scandal, and this was considered "a serious breach of contract". She left the label in 2014.

Discography

Albums

Singles

Other appearances

Filmography

Adult video (AV)

References

External links
 Agency profile 

1984 births
Being Inc. artists
Living people
Singers from Tokyo
Japanese women pop singers
Japanese pornographic film actresses
21st-century Japanese singers
21st-century Japanese women singers